The Canton of Selles-sur-Cher is an canton of the French department of Loir-et-Cher, central France. Its borders were modified at the French canton reorganisation which came into effect in March 2015. Its seat is in Selles-sur-Cher.

It consists of the following communes:
 
Billy
La Chapelle-Montmartin
Châtres-sur-Cher
Gièvres
Gy-en-Sologne
Langon-sur-Cher
Lassay-sur-Croisne
Maray
Mennetou-sur-Cher
Mur-de-Sologne
Orçay
Pruniers-en-Sologne
Saint-Julien-sur-Cher
Saint-Loup
Selles-sur-Cher
Theillay
Villefranche-sur-Cher

References

Cantons of Loir-et-Cher